Fritz Wenneis (1889–1969) was a German composer. He worked on more than fifty film scores.

Selected filmography
 A Storm Over Zakopane (1931)
 Bobby Gets Going (1931)
 Shadows of the Underworld (1931)
 Johnny Steals Europe (1932)
 Ship Without a Harbour (1932)
 Secret Agent (1932)
 Rasputin, Demon with Women (1932)
 Jumping Into the Abyss (1933)
 Master of the World (1934)
 Artisten (1934)
 The World Without a Mask (1934)
 The Sporck Battalion (1934)
 The Red Rider (1935)
 The Bird Seller (1935)
 The Schimeck Family (1935)
 The Call of the Jungle (1936)
 Orders Are Orders (1936)
 His Best Friend (1937)
 Men, Animals and Sensations (1938)
 The Right to Love (1939)
 The Tiger Akbar (1951)
 Border Post 58 (1951)
 Elephant Fury (1953)
 A Woman of Today (1954)

References

Bibliography 
 Giesen, Rolf. Nazi Propaganda Films: A History and Filmography. McFarland & Company, 2003.

External links 
 

Musicians from Mannheim
1889 births
1969 deaths
German composers